Soultone Cymbals, commonly known as Soultone, is a cymbal manufacturing company based in Los Angeles, California. It was founded in 2003 by Iki Levy, after struggling to address frustrations with the major cymbal manufacturers over quality issues.

Originally, as the proprietor of the Los Angeles drum specialty shop, The Drum Connection, Iki put his first Soultone models on the showroom floor with acoustic drums, so that customers could demo them as opposed to hanging them on a display.

Artists known to use Soultone cymbals include 
 Steven Adler of Guns N' Roses, 
 Nick Menza of Megadeth 
 Dave Goode of Mahogany Rush 
 Eddy Jones of Head East 
 Veronica Bellino of Jeff Beck and LL Cool J 
 Nick Smith of Snoop Dogg, 
 Eric Seats of Patti LaBelle 
 Ron Allen of SoMo 
 Jerry Tee of Jerry Tee Live Percussionist 
 Jerohn Garnett of Mariah Carey, 
 Adrian Peek of Mighty Joe Young and Roy Ayers 
 Alex Hilton of Kim Betts 
 Shane O'Brien of I Killed the Prom Queen 
 Eric Morotti of Suffocation 
 Jeremiah Stratton of Hed PE 
 Martin Osborne of Shadow Warriors
 Eddie Vallee of Boomer
 Rico H. of Stoneman 
 Brian Doherty of Making Monsters.

References

External links
 

Cymbal manufacturing companies
Musical instrument manufacturing companies based in Los Angeles